Sax Rohmer (pseudonym of Arthur Henry "Sarsfield" Ward; 1883–1959) was a British writer of songs sketches, plays and stories. Born in Birmingham to Irish immigrant parents, the family moved to London in about 1886, where Rohmer was schooled. His formal education finished in 1901, following the death of his alcoholic mother. After attempting careers in the civil service, as well as the banking, journalism and gas industries, Rohmer began writing comic songs, monologues and sketches for music hall performers, including Little Tich and George Robey. Rohmer's first book was Pause!, a series of sketches conceived by Robey and written by Rohmer, which was published anonymously in 1910; his second book was the ghost-written biography of Little Tich, published with Tich's real name, Harry Relph.

In 1913 The Mystery of Dr. Fu-Manchu was published, a novel that introduced Dr. Fu Manchu, described by Rohmer as "the yellow peril incarnate in one man". The book brought the author popularity and wealth; in total he wrote 13 Fu Manchu books during his lifetime and, although he killed the character off more than once, public pressure always demanded his return. Fu Manchu is the character with which Rohmer "remains most strongly identified" and was described by Rohmer's biographer Will Murray as one of the literary characters that "has achieved universal acceptance and popularity which will not be forgotten", along with Sherlock Holmes, Tarzan and Dracula. From 1951 onwards, Rohmer published five novels with Sumuru as the central antagonist; she was a female counterpart of Fu Manchu and her novels, too, were both popular and successful.

Rohmer contracted the Asian flu in 1958 and died the following year after related complications. His best-known character has outlived him through numerous film, radio and television interpretations.

Songs and monologues

Non-fiction

Novels and short story collections

Series

Dr. Fu Manchu
There are 13 novels, 4 short stories, and a play about Dr. Fu Manchu and his nemesis, Denis Nayland Smith.
The Mystery of Dr. Fu-Manchu (The Insidious Dr. Fu Manchu) (1913)
The Devil Doctor (The Return of Dr. Fu-Manchu) (1916)
The Si-Fan Mysteries (The Hand of Fu-Manchu) (1917)
Fu Manchu: A Chinese Melodrama (1919) - a play written with Willard Mack
The Daughter of Fu Manchu (1931)
The Mask of Fu Manchu (1932)
The Bride of Fu Manchu (1933)
The Trail of Fu Manchu (1934)
President Fu Manchu (1936)
The Drums of Fu Manchu (1939)
The Island of Fu Manchu (1941)
The Shadow of Fu Manchu (1948)
"The Wrath of Fu Manchu" (1973)
Re-Enter Dr. Fu Manchu (1958)
"The Eyes of Fu Manchu" (1973)
"The Word of Fu Manchu" (1973)
"The Mind of Fu Manchu" (1973)
Emperor Fu Manchu (1959)
Denis Nayland Smith

There are 3 short stories featuring Denis Nayland Smith in which Dr. Fu Manchu does not appear

 "The Blue Monkey" in The Haunting of Low Fennel (1920) (The identities of Nayland Smith and Dr. Petrie are strongly hinted, though not explicitly stated in this story.)
"The Mark of the Monkey" (Brittania & Eve, April 1931)
"The Turkish Yataghan" (Colliers's, January 1932)
Gaston Max 

There are 4 novels featuring the Parisian detective, Gaston Max.

 The Yellow Claw (1915)
The Golden Scorpion (1919)
The Day the World Ended (1930)
Seven Sins (1943)

Sumuru
Nude in Mink (The Sins of Sumuru) (1950)
The Slaves of Sumuru (1951)
Virgin in Flames (The Fire Goddess) (1952)
Sand and Satin (The Return of Sumuru) (1954)
Sinister Madonna (1956)
John Robert Colombo compiled the Sumuru Omnibus in 2011.

Red Kerry
Dope: A Story of Chinatown and the Drug Traffic (1919)
"The Daughter of Huang Chow", "Kerry's Kid" in Tales of Chinatown (1922)
Yellow Shadows (1925)

Paul Harley
Bat-Wing (1921)
Fire-Tongue (1921)
"The House of the Golden Joss", "The Man with the Shaven Skull" in Tales of Chinatown (1922)

Bimbashi Baruk

There are 10 short stories featuring this Egyptian major, collected in Bimbashi Baruk of Egypt (Egyptian Nights) (1944)

 "Mystery Strikes at Ragstaff Hill" (Collier's, May 31, 1941 as "A Heart in Her Hands")
"The Bimbashi Meets Up with A 14" (Collier's, August 23, 1941 as "Pool-o'-the-Moon"')
"Murder Strikes in Lychgate" (Collier's, April 11, 1941 as "Four and Twenty Cobblers")
"The Laughing Buddha Finds a Purchaser" (Collier's, February 21, 1942 as "Laughing Buddha")
"Warning from Rose of the Desert"
"Lotus Yuan Loses Her Vanity Case" (Collier's, September 19, 1942 as "Blue Anemones")
"The Scarab of Lapis Lazuli" (Collier's November 7, 1942 as "Serpent Wind")
"Vengeance at the Lily Pool" (Collier's, February 13, 1942 as "The Man Who Killed Blackbirds")
"Adventure in the Libyan Desert"
"Pool-o'-the-Moon Sees Bimbashi Baruk"
Moris Klaw

There are 10 short stories featuring this detective and ghost-breaking hero, collected in The Dream Detective (1920)

 "Case of the Tragedies in the Greek Room" (The New Magazine, April 1913)
"Case of the Potsherd of Anubis"  (The New Magazine,  May 1913)
"Case of the Crusader's Ax" (The New Magazine, June 1913)
"Case of the Ivory Statue" (The New Magazine, July 1913)
"Case of the Blue Rajah" (The New Magazine,  August 1913)
"Case of the Whispering Poplars" (The New Magazine, September 1913)
"Case of the Chord in G" (The New Magazine, October 1913)
"Case of the Headless Mummies" (The New Magazine, November 1913)
"Case of the Haunting Of Grange" (The New Magazine, December 1913)
"Case of the Veil of Isis" (The New Magazine, January 1914)

Plays

References

Sources

External links

 
 
 
 
 

Bibliographies of British writers